Treponema succinifaciens is an anaerobic spirochete bacterium first discovered in the intestines of swine in 1981. The helical cells of T. succinifaciens grow to 16 μm in length and often form chains of cells when cultured. T. succinifaciens is gram-negative and non spore-forming.

In humans 
Treponema succinifaciens is found in the gut microbiome of some human populations, but is not found in humans living in urban areas. The bacterium has been found in many rural and traditional human populations such as foragers from the Congo, Bedouins, Amazonians, and Tuaregs. This is likely due to increased antibiotic use in urban populations, as well as cross-contamination from animals in rural and traditional populations.

Genome 
The genome of T. succinifaciens is 2,897,425 base pairs in length. The bacterium contains 2,723 protein-coding as well as 63 RNA genes. It also contains 63 genes that are involved in motility.

References 

succinifaciens